The Northern Islands series is a family of GPUs developed by Advanced Micro Devices (AMD) forming part of its Radeon-brand, based on the 40 nm process. Some models are based on TeraScale 2 (VLIW5), some on the new TeraScale 3 (VLIW4) introduced with them.

Starting with this family, the former ATI brand was officially discontinued in favor of making a correlation between the graphics products and the AMD branding for computing platforms (the CPUs and chipsets).  Therefore, the AMD brand was used as the replacement. The logo for graphics products and technologies also received a minor makeover (using design elements of the 2010 "AMD Vision" logo). This also marks the end of the "Mobility Radeon" name in their laptop GPUs, keeping only the "M" suffix in the GPU model number to signify a Mobile variant.

Its direct competitor was Nvidia's GeForce 500 Series; they were launched approximately a month apart.

Architecture
This article is about all products under the Radeon HD 6000 Series brand.
 A GPU implementing TeraScale 2 version "Northern Island (VLIW5)" is found on all models except the "HD 6900" branded products.
 The "HD 6350" is based on TeraScale 2 "Evergreen".
 A GPU implementing TeraScale 3 version "Northern Island (VLIW4)" is found on "HD 6900" branded products.
 OpenGL 4.x compliance requires supporting FP64 shaders. These are implemented by emulation on some TeraScale (microarchitecture) GPUs.

Multi-monitor support

The AMD Eyefinity-branded on-die display controllers were introduced in September 2009 in the Radeon HD 5000 Series and have been present in all products since.

Video acceleration
Unified Video Decoder (UVD3) is present on the die of all products and supported by AMD Catalyst and by the free and open-source graphics device driver.

OpenCL (API) 

OpenCL accelerates many scientific Software Packages against CPU up to factor 10 or 100 and more.
Open CL 1.0 to 1.2 are supported for all Chips with Terascale 2 and 3.

Products
The 6800 series was the first batch of the Radeon 6000 series. Codenamed ''Northern Islands'', this series was released on October 22, 2010, after brief delays. Over the following months, the budget, midrange, and high-end cards were filled into the series.

Radeon HD 6400
AMD released the entry-level Radeon HD 6400 GPU on February 7, 2011. Codenamed Caicos, it came to market at the same time as the Radeon HD 6500/6600 Turks GPUs. The sole Caicos product, the Radeon HD 6450, aimed to replace the HD 5450. Compared to the 5450 it has double the stream processors, GDDR5 support, along with new Northern Island technologies.

Radeon HD 6500/6600
Codenamed Turks, these entry-level GPUs were released on February 7, 2011. The Turks family includes Turks PRO and Turks XT which are marketed as HD 6570 and HD 6670 respectively. They were originally released to OEMs only, but later released to retail.

The Radeon HD 6570 and 6670 are minor upgrades of their Evergreen counterparts, the HD 5570 and 5670. Turks GPUs contain 80 more stream processors and 4 more texture units. They have also been upgraded to support the new technologies found in the Northern Islands GPUs such as HDMI 1.4a, UVD3, and stereoscopic 3D.

Radeon HD 6700
Codenamed Barts LE, the Radeon HD 6790 was released on April 5, 2011. There is one retail product available, the Radeon HD 6790. Barts uses shaders of the same 5-way VLIW architecture as HD 5000 series.

HD 6790 has 800 stream processors at 840 MHz, a 256-bit memory interface and 1 GB GDDR5 DRAM at 1 GHz with maximum power draw of 150W. Performance is superior to the NVIDIA GTX 550 Ti and Radeon HD 5770, less powerful than the Radeon HD 6850 and close to the GTX 460 768MB and Radeon HD 5830.

AMD has confirmed that the HD 6700 cards use the Juniper XT and Juniper Pro cores from the HD 5700 series, and therefore they are not formally Northern Islands GPUs. Thus 6770 and 6750 are essentially the 5770 and 5750 respectively, with label being the main difference. There are a few enhancements to the 5700 series including:

In the HD 6000-series cards, AMD's Universal Video Decoder was upgraded to version 3.0 which supported Blu-ray 3D codecs, hardware decoding for DivX / XviD and a list of other improvements. The HD 6750 and HD 6770 adds the MVC decode capability of UVD 3.0, but not the rest of the UVD 3.0 features.
According to AMD, these cards have been upgraded to support HDMI 1.4a but without the 3D features brought forward by UVD 3.0.

Radeon HD 6800
Codenamed Barts, the Radeon HD 6800 series was released on October 23, 2010. Products include Radeon HD 6850 and Radeon HD 6870. Barts uses shaders of the same 5-way VLIW architecture as HD 5000 series.

HD 6850 has 960 stream processors at 775 MHz, a 256-bit memory interface and 1 GB GDDR5 DRAM at 1 GHz with maximum power draw of 127 W. Compared to competitors, performance falls in line with the 1 GB cards of the Nvidia GeForce GTX 460. Compared to predecessor graphics of the Radeon 5800 series, the 6850 is significantly faster than the Radeon HD 5830 and close to the performance of the Radeon HD 5850. A single 6-pin PCIe power connector requirement makes it suitable for most power supplies.
HD 6870 has 1120 stream processors at 900 MHz (most GPUs are able to run with 980-1000 MHz), a 256-bit memory interface and 1 GB GDDR5 DRAM at 1.05 GHz (can be overclocked to 1.2 GHz (4.8 GHz effective)) with a maximum power draw of 151 W. Performance is superior to the GeForce GTX 460, comparable to the GeForce GTX 560, and less than the GeForce GTX 560 Ti. Compared to predecessor graphics cards of the Radeon 5800 series, the HD 6870 is faster than the HD 5850 and close to the performance of the Radeon HD 5870.

Radeon HD 6900
This family includes three different high-end products all based on TeraScale 3 (VLIW4)

Codenamed Cayman, the Radeon HD 6900 series was expected to be released on November 12, 2010.  These release dates were pushed further back and Cayman was released on December 15, 2010. Products include Radeon HD 6950 and Radeon HD 6970.  Cayman is based on new 4-way VLIW architecture, which was chosen over AMD's older VLIW5 in order to reduce complexity in the design of AMD's stream processors.  Studies showed that few applications fully leveraged the extra stage in a VLIW5 SP.  Reducing the stream processors to VLIW4 allows AMD to save on transistors for each individual SP and add more overall in the future.

In games, the performance of HD 6970 is comparable to the NVIDIA GeForce GTX 570 and GTX 480. The Radeon HD 6950 is slightly slower than the 6970, comparable to slightly faster than the GTX 560 Ti and faster than the HD 5870. The HD 6950 was further discovered to be nearly identical to the 6970 in core design, though the 6950 has lower rated GDDR5 memory. Other than that, the two only differed in BIOS flashed software. As such, a BIOS flash would essentially upgrade the 6950 to a 6970. This was later addressed by AMD and its partners by laser cutting the extra cores (rather than simply disabling them in BIOS), and/or using non-reference card designs that would not work with a 6970 BIOS. Some 6950s can still be "unlocked", but it is much more difficult, requiring careful card selection and custom BIOS.
Codenamed Antilles, the Enthusiast dual-GPU (dual-6970) Radeon HD 6990 was launched on March 9, 2011. It features an 830 MHz reference engine clock speed, 3072 stream processors, 5.1 TFLOPS computing performance, 192 texture units, 4 GB of GDDR5 frame buffer (DRAM), and 375 W maximum board power.
The AMD Radeon HD 6990 (As with some other 6000 Series AMD Cards) comes with a dual BIOS switch. This enables what some claim to be a hidden 'AMD Uber Mode', however it is used most commonly as a backup when flashing the BIOS. (The same method used to flash the HD 6950 to appear as a HD 6970)

AMD PowerTune was introduced with Radeon HD 6900 series.

Chipset table

Desktop Products

IGP (HD 6xxx)
 All models are based on the VLIW5 ISA
 All models support DirectX 11.0, OpenGL 4.5 (beta), OpenCL 1.2
 All models do not feature double-precision FP
 All models feature the UNB/MC Bus interface
 All models feature Angle independent anisotropic filtering, UVD3, and Eyefinity capabilities, with up to three outputs. HD 63xxD and higher feature 3D Blu-ray acceleration, while the standard 63xx (non-'D') does not.
Desktop

Ultra-mobile

Mobile Products

IGP (HD 6xxxG)
 All models are based on the VLIW5 ISA
 All models support DirectX 11.0, OpenGL 4.5 (beta), OpenCL 1.2
 All models do not feature double-precision FP
 All models feature the UNB/MC Bus interface
 All models feature Angle independent anisotropic filtering, UVD3 and Eyefinity capabilities, with up to 3 outputs.

 1 Unified Shaders : Texture mapping units : Render output units
 2 TDP specified for AMD reference designs, includes CPU power consumption. Actual TDP of retail products may vary.

Radeon Feature Matrix

See also
 Radeon HD 2000 series
 Radeon HD 3000 series
 Radeon HD 4000 series
 Radeon HD 5000 series
 Radeon HD 7000 series
 Radeon HD 8000 series
 AMD Radeon Rx 200 series (successor to HD 8000 series)
 List of AMD graphics processing units
 Free and open-source graphics device driver § ATI/AMD

References

External links
 
 
 AMD Radeon HD 6000 series
 techPowerUp! GPU Database

AMD graphics cards
Computer-related introductions in 2010
Graphics cards